Patrick Rolland (born 7 June 1979) is a Canadian-born French former ice hockey goaltender. 

Rolland was born in Montreal, Quebec, Canada. He played his entire career in France, playing for Viry-Châtillon EH, Hockey Club de Reims, Brûleurs de Loups and Brest Albatros Hockey. He also competed in the men's tournament at the 2002 Winter Olympics.

References

External links

1979 births
Living people
Brest Albatros Hockey players
Brûleurs de Loups players
Canadian ice hockey goaltenders
Diables Rouges de Briançon players
French ice hockey goaltenders
Ice hockey players at the 2002 Winter Olympics
Olympic ice hockey players of France
Ours de Villard-de-Lans players
Hockey Club de Reims players
Ice hockey people from Montreal
Viry-Châtillon EH players